Alan Hanjalic is an engineer who is a full professor  at the Delft University of Technology in Delft, the Netherlands. He was named a Fellow of the Institute of Electrical and Electronics Engineers (IEEE) in 2016 for his contributions to multimedia information retrieval.

References 

Fellow Members of the IEEE
Living people
Academic staff of the Delft University of Technology
Dutch engineers
Year of birth missing (living people)